Koruran may refer to:
 Koruran Olya
 Koruran-e Sofla